"Stay in My Corner" is a 1965 soul song by The Dells. It was released as a single on the Vee-Jay label and peaked in the top 30 on the R&B singles chart. Three years later, The Dells rerecorded "Stay in My Corner" on the Cadet label and took the new version of the song to number one for three weeks on the R&B charts.  The single was the most successful of their career and crossed over to the pop charts as well..

The songwriters were Wade Flemons, Robert Eugene Miller, and Barrett Strong.

Patti LaBelle recorded a cover of the song for her 1994 album, Gems.

Chart positions

Chart positions

References

1965 singles
1968 singles
Songs written by Barrett Strong
Songs written by Wade Flemons
Vee-Jay Records singles
Cadet Records singles
1965 songs